Open Cluster NGC 2175 (also known as OCL 476 or Cr 84) is an open cluster in the Orion constellation, embedded in a diffusion nebula. It was discovered by Giovanni Batista Hodierna before 1654 and  independently discovered by Karl Christian Bruhns in 1857. NGC 2175 is at a distance of about 6,350 light years away from Earth.

The nebula surrounding it is Sharpless catalog Sh 2-252.

There is some equivocation in the use of the identifiers NGC 2174 and NGC 2175.  These may apply to the entire nebula, to its brightest knot, or to the star cluster it includes.  Burnham's Celestial Handbook lists the entire nebula as 2174/2175 and does not mention the star cluster.  The NGC Project (working from the original descriptive notes) assigns NGC 2174 to the prominent knot at J2000 ,  and NGC 2175 to the entire nebula, and by extension to the star cluster.  Simbad uses NGC 2174 for the nebula and NGC 2175 for the star cluster.

References

External links

 NGC 2175 @ SEDS NGC objects pages
 

2175
Open clusters
Orion (constellation)